Sarina State High School is located in the small rural town of Sarina, Queensland, Australia. The school had 600 students in 2013 with a reported 20 percent continuing studies at University.

Sarina State High previously boasted a marine aquarium with a reef tank, freshwater tank, an estuarine tank, and a touch tank where students can get a literal "feel" for marine life.

There is a A$659 vocational qualifications agricultural initiative completed at the school that has national ministerial support.

Sarina High School has produced 4 State of Origin Representatives: Dale Shearer, Kevin Campion, Wendell Sailor and Reuben Cotter. Radio host Paul Campion is also an alum.

References

Public high schools in Queensland
Schools in North Queensland
Educational institutions established in 1956
1956 establishments in Australia